Spankie Jackzon is the stage name of Blair Macbeth (born 4 November 1984), a New Zealand drag performer. She is best known for winning the second season of RuPaul's Drag Race Down Under in 2022. Previously, in 2020, she also won the second season of the New Zealand television series House of Drag.

Career 
Jackzon is based in Palmerston North. She started performing in drag as early as 2005, eventually moving to Melbourne in the late 2010s to develop a career in the city's nightlight scene; at one point in her career, she hosted eight different club residences simultaneously in the city of Melbourne. 

In 2020, Jackzon joined the second season of the New Zealand television series House of Drag as an “intruder” contestant in the fourth episode. She eventually won the competition, beating Elektra Shock in the finale. 

In 2022, Jackzon was announced as one of ten queens to compete on the second season of RuPaul’s Drag Race Down Under, and after winning three main challenges, she would go on to win the season, with Hannah Conda and Kween Kong as runners-up. One of the hosts of House of Drag, Kita Mean, who previously won the first season of Rupaul's Drag Race Down Under, presented Jackzon with her crown and sceptre during the finale episode of the second season, marking the second time that Mean crowned Jackzon on television (House of Drag and RuPaul’s Drag Race Down Under).

Filmography

Television

References

External links
 
 
 

1984 births
Living people
New Zealand drag queens
RuPaul's Drag Race Down Under winners